Sticking Fingers into Sockets is a compilation EP released by Welsh indie pop band Los Campesinos! in 2007. It collects their two previously released 7-inch UK singles onto one CD. It was released through Arts & Crafts, being the band's first release with the label.

Track four, "Frontwards", is a cover of a song by Pavement, released on their 1992 EP Watery, Domestic.

The release was positively received by critics. Music publication Pitchfork, in a 8.4/10 review, called it a "superbly crafted indie pop" record.

Track listing
All tracks written by Gareth Paisey and Tom Bromley, except for "Frontwards" by Stephen Malkmus and Scott Kannberg.

 "We Throw Parties, You Throw Knives" – 2:18
 "It Started With a Mixx" – 1:19
 "Don't Tell Me to Do the Math(s)" – 3:20
 "Frontwards" – 2:18
 "You! Me! Dancing!" – 6:12
 "Clunk-Rewind-Clunk-Play-Clunk" – 0:35

Release history

Personnel
 Aleksandra Berditchevskaia – vocals, keyboard
 Ellen Waddell – bass guitar
 Gareth Paisey – vocals, glockenspiel
 Harriet Coleman – violin, keyboard
 Neil Turner – guitar
 Ollie Briggs – drums
 Tom Bromley – lead guitar
 David Newfeld – producer
 Luke Jones – engineer (4, 6)

References 

2007 debut EPs
Los Campesinos! albums
Arts & Crafts Productions EPs
Wichita Recordings EPs